Viridicatumtoxin B is a fungus-derived tetracycline-like antibiotic discovered in 2008. It was isolated from small amounts of penicillium fungi. A synthetic structure matching that of natural viridicatumtoxin B makes possible synthetic variants that match or surpass its antibiotic potency.

Analogs lacking a hydroxyl group were even more effective than the original against Gram-positive bacteria.

Concerns about solubility, biodegradation, availability and other issues must be resolved before clinical development begins.

History 

The substance was first isolated from the mycelium of liquid fermentation cultures of Penicillium species FR11.

Structure 

Based on mass spectrometry and nuclear magnetic resonance data, the substance was originally thought to be the 11a',12'-epoxide, but the structure was later revised.

Effects 

Viridicatumtoxin B inhibited the growth of Staphylococcus aureus, including methicillin resistant S. aureus and quinolone-resistant S. aureus with a minimum inhibitory concentration of 0.5 μg/ml. That effect is similar to that of vancomycin, but 8 to 64 times greater than that of tetracycline.

Total synthesis 
A complete total synthesis of viridicatumtoxin B, in racemic form, was completed in 2013 by the group of K. C. Nicolaou.

See also
 Viridicatumtoxin A

References 

Tetracycline antibiotics
Spiro compounds
Cyclohexenes